Ghercești is a commune in Dolj County, Oltenia, Romania with a population of 1,598 people. It is composed of five villages: Gârlești, Ghercești, Luncșoru, Ungureni and Ungurenii Mici.

References

Communes in Dolj County
Localities in Oltenia